Argyrotaenia spinacallis is a species of moth of the family Tortricidae. It is found in Mexico (Veracruz and the State of Mexico).

The length of the forewings is 9.5–10.5 mm for males and 9.3–9.5 mm for females. The costal half of the forewings is copper brown and the lower half is pale yellow orange. The hindwings are pale grey.

Etymology
The species name refers to the irregular rows of spinelike teeth on the aedeagus.

References

Moths described in 2000
spinacallis
Moths of Central America